The Vettor Pisani class consisted of two armoured cruisers built for the Royal Italian Navy (Regia Marina) in the 1890s. The two ships of the class, Vettor Pisani and Carlo Alberto, were frequently deployed overseas during their careers. The former served in the Far East during the Boxer Rebellion of 1900 while the latter was involved in pioneering long-range radio experiments several years later before deploying to South American waters. Carlo Alberto then served as a training ship for several years. Both ships participated in the Italo-Turkish War of 1911–12 and played minor roles in World War I, during which time Carlo Alberto was converted into a troop transport and Vettor Pisani into a repair ship. They were both discarded in 1920 and subsequently scrapped.

Design and description

The Vettor Pisani class had a complement of 28 officers and 472 to 476 enlisted men.

The ships were powered by two vertical triple-expansion steam engines, each driving one propeller shaft. Steam for the engines was supplied by eight Scotch marine boilers and their exhausts were trunked into a pair of funnels amidships.

The main armament of the Vettor Pisani-class ships consisted of twelve quick-firing (QF) Cannone da 152/40 A Modello 1891 guns in single mounts. These  weapons had 40-caliber barrels. All of these guns were mounted on the broadside, eight on the upper deck and four at the corners of the central citadel in armored casemates.

Single 40-caliber QF Cannone da 120/40 A Modello 1891 guns were mounted at the bow and stern and the remaining two or four  guns were positioned on the main deck between the 152 mm guns. The  armor-piercing shell had a muzzle velocity of  when fired by these guns. For defense against torpedo boats, the ships carried fourteen QF  Hotchkiss guns and six or eight QF  Hotchkiss guns. They were also equipped with four  torpedo tubes.

The upper strake of armor was also 15 cm thick and protected just the middle of the ship, up to the height of the upper deck. The curved armored deck was 3.7 cm thick. The conning tower armor was also 15 cm thick and each 15.2 cm gun was protected by a  gun shield.

Ships

Service
Vettor Pisani was the flagship of Rear Admiral Candiani, commander of the Cruising Squadron dispatched to China in 1900 during the Boxer Rebellion. She arrived at La Spezia in early 1902, but only remained in Italian waters for a year before returning to the Far East for another year-long cruise.

Carlo Alberto acted as the royal yacht for King Victor Emmanuel III when he attended the coronation ceremony for King Edward VII of the United Kingdom in 1902. Victor Emmanuel invited Guglielmo Marconi to accompany him and conduct radio experiments en route. When the coronation was delayed by Edward's illness, the ship took Victor Emmanuel to meetings with Tsar Nicholas II of Russia in Kronstadt. She then ferried Marconi across the Atlantic to Nova Scotia for experiments transmitting radio messages across the ocean. After 15 December, when Marconi successfully transmitted messages from Canada to England, Carlo Alberto was sent to Venezuelan waters during the Venezuelan crisis of 1902–03, when an international force of British, German, and Italian warships blockaded Venezuela over the country's refusal to pay foreign debts. From 1907 to 1910 she served as a gunnery and torpedo training ship.

Both ships participated in the Italo-Turkish War of 1911–12. Vettor Pisani supported operations in the Adriatic and Aegean Seas and in the Dardanelles while Carlo Alberto took part in the assaults on Tripoli and Zuara and thereafter provided gunfire support to Italian forces in North Africa.

Obsolescent by the beginning of World War I, neither ship was very active during the war. Vettor Pisani spent the war in the Adriatic and participated in an abortive attempt in mid-1915 to bombard a rail line near Ragusa Vecchia on the Dalmatian coast. An Austro-Hungarian submarine, U-4, intercepted the Italian ships and sank the armored cruiser . Vettor Pisani subsequently became a repair ship in 1916 and was stricken from the Navy List on 2 January 1920. She was sold for scrap and broken up beginning on 13 March.

Carlo Alberto spent the almost the entire war based in Venice. She began conversion into a troop transport there in 1917 and the work was finished in Taranto early the next year; she was recommissioned with the new name of Zenson. The ship was discarded on 12 June 1920 and subsequently scrapped.

Notes

Footnotes

References

External links

 Classe Vettor Pisani Marina Militare website

 
Cruisers of Italy
Cruiser classes
Cruisers of the Regia Marina